Gael Joel Akogo Esono Nchama (born 23 November 2003), simply known as Gael, is an Equatorial Guinean footballer who plays as a central midfielder for Cano Sport Academy and the Equatorial Guinea national team.

Club career
Gael is a product of Cano Sport Academy in Equatorial Guinea.

International career
Gael made his senior debut for Equatorial Guinea on 23 March 2022, as a substitution during the second half of a 0–3 friendly loss to Guinea-Bissau.

References

External links

2003 births
Living people
People from Ebibeyin
Equatoguinean footballers
Association football midfielders
Cano Sport Academy players
Equatorial Guinea international footballers